511th may refer to:

511th Bombardment Squadron, inactive United States Air Force unit
511th Heavy Panzer Battalion, German World War II independent armoured battalion equipped with heavy tanks
511th Parachute Infantry Regiment (United States), unit of the United States Army first activated during World War II
511th Tactical Fighter Squadron, inactive United States Air Force unit

See also
511 (number)
511 (disambiguation)
511, the year 511 (DXI) of the Julian calendar
511 BC